This article lists all the captains of the Australia national men's soccer team.

The first Australia captain was Alex Gibb; he captained Australia in their first international match, against New Zealand on 17 June 1922. He went on to captain Australia on five further occasions, captained Australia in their first international on home soil, 9 June 1923 vs. New Zealand, and was the first international captain to win a match.

Since then, Lucas Neill went on to set the record for most captaincies of his country, with 61.

List of captains

Captains by tournamentBold indicates tournament winners
Italics indicates tournament hosts

Captains by appearances as captain
Figures include all recognised matches up to 1 February 2022. The default order for this list is by most appearances as captain, then chronological order of first captaincy.  Only confirmed captaincies are counted.Bold indicates active players

ReferencesGeneral 
 
 Specific'

captains
Australia
Association football player non-biographical articles